Andrew Edward Sloan is an American neurosurgeon and physician-scientist. He is the Peter D. Cristal Chair of Neurosurgical Oncology at Case Western Reserve University. In June 2000, Sloan married biostatistician and data scientist Jill S. Barnholtz-Sloan at the Missouri Botanical Garden.

He graduated from Yale College and Harvard Medical School.

References 

Living people
Year of birth missing (living people)
Place of birth missing (living people)
21st-century American physicians
Physician-scientists
American neurosurgeons
Case Western Reserve University faculty
Yale College alumni
Harvard Medical School alumni